Rubén Sánchez may refer to:
Rubén Sánchez (journalist) (born 1963), Puerto Rican journalist
Rubén Sánchez León (born 1973), Mexican boxer
Rubén Sánchez (footballer, born 1989), Spanish football winger for Huracán Balazote
Rubén Sánchez (footballer, born 1994), Spanish football forward for Rayo Majadahonda
Rubén Sánchez (footballer, born 2001), Spanish football right-back for Espanyol

See also
Frédéric Bourdin (born 1974), French imposter who used the identity Ruben Sanchez Espinoza